WLIP (1050 AM) is a radio station located in Kenosha, Wisconsin, United States, serving the Chicago-Milwaukee metropolitan region along the west shore of Lake Michigan with 250 watts, and also streaming worldwide at www.wlip.com. The station is owned by Alpha Media, through licensee Alpha Media Licensee LLC. The station's transmitter is located in Pleasant Prairie, while its studios are based in the north end of the Gurnee Mills mall in Gurnee, Illinois.

1050 AM is a Mexican clear-channel frequency.

History
At 8:00 AM on Sunday, May 18, 1947, WLIP signed on the air from the Kenosha National Bank Building basement at 625 57th Street in downtown Kenosha, licensed as a daytime-only station and 250 watts. In 1982, WLIP built and opened its new studios at 8500 Green Bay Road.

In 1962, the station launched an FM sister: 95.1 WLIP-FM, later known as WJZQ, and now the current-day WIIL

During the late 1950s and much of the 1960s, the AM station programmed a Top 40 music format; however, the owner, Bill Lipman, did not allow for "Hits" to be played. A weekend show with former station staffer Terry Havel would be the only show featuring the hits. The station would sign off at sundown. 

As Kenosha was the home of American Motors, the station was a strong union operation, having on-air staff under AFTRA and engineers under IBEW representation, rare for a station in a mid-sized city such as Kenosha, with its programming choices also reflecting its strong "at work" audience at AMC (and its own forerunners) and other large Kenosha factories. 

WLIP-FM offered separate programming during that time and carried an easy listening format. Bill Lipman's wife, Anne, was influential in the music choices of WLIP-FM, again until 1975 when new management took over. In 1975, these rules ended under new management, and the station moved to an Adult Contemporary format as "Music 1050" with a high dedication to the Kenosha area as the station had in the past and still does somewhat today. Lipman's sons and daughter represented ownership's interests of the stations by the late 1970s. 

In 1987, the Federal Communications Commission granted WLIP permission to broadcast on a 24-hour-a-day basis. During the 1990s the station continued with its Adult Contemporary format but was mostly various talk programming by the mid-1990s with Oldies music played nights and weekends. In 1996 the station changed its format to adult standards from the now-Dial Global Adult Standards format (syndicated) This format lasted until December 2003 when the station changed format and affiliation to the now-defunct Unforgettable Favorites format from ABC. This format was switched over the 4th of July weekend 2005 to ABC's Oldies Radio now known as Classic Hits Radio.

Current programming
WLIP airs local talk programming during most of the day and replays some of them in the evenings  with the syndicated talk show Jim Bohannon's America in the Morning and The Jim Bohannon Show. On the weekends it airs how-to programming, music programming, brokered shows, and talk shows most of which are local.

Music
WLIP has broadcast music most of its life. Currently the station plays 1960s-1970s oldies music during part of each weekend, along with specialty 1950s-1960s oldies shows Jukebox Saturday Night on Saturdays and The Doo-Wop Diner on Sundays. The Music of the Stars with Lou Rugani has aired each Sunday morning since 1992 and also at times in the afternoon.

References

External links

The Music of the Stars
Remembering Kenosha

LIP
Talk radio stations in the United States
Full service radio stations in the United States
Radio stations established in 1947
1947 establishments in Wisconsin
Alpha Media radio stations